Fernando de Helguero (1 November 1880, Pelago – 28 December 1908, Messina) was an Italian mathematician, statistician and pioneer of biostatistics.

Fernando de Helguero was born near Florence. He studied mathematics at the University of Rome. After receiving his licentiate degree in 1903, he taught mathematics while he studied natural sciences, biology, statistics, and biometry. He was an Invited Speaker of the ICM in Rome in April 1908. However, he died later the same year in the 1908 Messina earthquake.

His collected papers were published in 1972.

According to Azzalini and Capitanio:

Selected publications

References

External links
"Skew-symmetric distributions and associated inferential problems" by Elissa Burghgraeve, M.S. thesis, Ghent University, 2017 (historical background concerning de Helguero's work)

1880 births
1908 deaths
Italian statisticians
20th-century Italian mathematicians
Victims of the 1908 Messina earthquake